The Mostyn Medal is an annual award given in the AFL Sydney. It is awarded to best and fairest player of the Women's Premier Division competition each year and is named after Sam Mostyn, the first ever female AFL Commissioner.

At the completion of each match, the field umpires combine to cast votes for the three best players on the ground in a 3-2-1 format. The player with the most votes at the end of the season is considered the Best and Fairest player and is awarded the Mostyn Medal.

The award was first awarded in 2012 when the Sydney Women's AFL came under the umbrella of AFL Sydney, and was named the Mostyn Medal in 2015.

Due to the cancellation of the 2021 AFL Sydney  season due to the COVID-19 outbreak across Greater Sydney, the medal was not awarded in 2021.

Mostyn Medallists

Multiple Winners

Mostyn Medallists by club

See also 

 Sydney AFL
 Phelan Medal
 Bob Skilton Medal
 Brett Kirk Medal
 Kevin Sheedy Medal

References 

Australian rules football in New South Wales
Australian rules football awards
Awards established in 2012
2012 establishments in Australia